Yekaterina Alexeyevna Furtseva (7 December 1910 – 24 October 1974) was a Soviet politician and the second woman to be admitted as secretary of the Central Committee of the Communist Party of the Soviet Union (the first being Yelena Stasova, member of the 7th Bureau). 

Furtseva was born in Vyshny Volochyok.  Until the 1940s, she worked as an ordinary weaver at one of Moscow's textile factories. She had been a minor party worker in Kursk and the Crimea, and was called to Moscow and sent to the Institute of Chemical Technology from where she graduated in 1941 as a chemical engineer.
Furtseva's party career started under Joseph Stalin. Gradually, she became active in Komsomol affairs and rose to the position of Secretary of the Moscow City Council in 1950. She gave a speech at the 19th Congress of the CPSU in 1952, the last party congress of the Stalin era, where she was also elected a candidate member of the Central Committee of the CPSU. Under Nikita Khrushchev, who sympathized with her, Furtseva was the first secretary of Moscow Committee of the CPSU from 1954 to 1957, a job Khrushchev himself occupied in 1930s.

In 1952, Furtseva attacked the leading filmstar, Boris Babochkin, who was famous after starring as Vasily Chapayev. This time Furtseva saw the actor starring in a stageplay, and was enraged by Babochkin's satirical portrayal of the Soviet communist leadership. Her angry article in the Soviet newspaper Pravda called for censorship of Babochkin, while Furtseva furthered her career in the Soviet elite. Then Furtseva personally ordered that all film studios and drama companies of the USSR should refuse Babochkin any jobs, keeping him unemployed.

In 1956 she was appointed a Secretary of the Central Committee and was elected a candidate member of Presidium of the Central Committee (aka the Politburo). She became the first woman to join the Politburo the next year. In this capacity, she sided with Khrushchev in de-Stalinization during the Khrushchev's Thaw, and secured the downfall of Vyacheslav Molotov, Georgy Malenkov, and Lazar Kaganovich when they conspired to depose her patron.

During that time she fell in love with Nikolay Firyubin, the Soviet ambassador in Yugoslavia. Furtseva scandalized the Soviet elite by her weekend trips abroad in order to meet her lover. As he married her and rose to become the Deputy Foreign Minister, they settled in Moscow, and their relations cooled down somewhat.

In May 1960, Furtseva suddenly lost her position as a Secretary of the Central Committee, and was appointed USSR Minister for Culture. The reason, reputedly, is that she criticised Khrushchev in a telephone conversation, and he came to hear of it. At the next party congress, in October 1961, she was also removed from the Praesidium. On learning of her dismissal, she reputedly attempted suicide by cutting her wrists.  However, she retained her post as Minister for Culture for 14 years. As she became highly influential, many remarkable actors and directors tried to secure her friendship in order to further their own careers. According to the most intimate of her friends (such as the singer Lyudmila Zykina), she also became addicted to alcohol. On 19 June 1974, Pravda revealed that she had failed to be re-elected to the Supreme Soviet. Two months previous she had been disciplined by the Party for extravagance and fined 40,000 rubles. She died in Moscow a few months later, officially of heart failure. Yet there were rumors that she was implicated in illegal commercial dealings and, wishing to preclude the impending scandal and disgrace, committed suicide. Furtseva is buried at the Novodevichye Cemetery.

References 

1910 births
1974 deaths
Burials at Novodevichy Cemetery
People from Vyshny Volochyok
Central Committee of the Communist Party of the Soviet Union members
Culture ministers of the Soviet Union
Politburo of the Central Committee of the Communist Party of the Soviet Union members
Soviet women in politics
Textile workers
Soviet communists